Myosin-XVIIIa is a protein that in humans is encoded by the MYO18A gene.

References

Further reading